The 1917 Boston College football team was an American football team that represented Boston College as an independent during the 1917 college football season. Led by Charles Brickley in his second and final season as head coach, Boston College compiled a record of 6–2.

Schedule

References

Boston College
Boston College Eagles football seasons
Boston College football
1910s in Boston